Teontha is a village in Pundri Tehsil in Kaithal district of Haryana State, India. It is located 21 kilometres towards east from district headquarters Kaithal, 40 km from Karnal, 5 kilometres from Pundri and 125 kilometres from state capital Chandigarh 165 km from Delhi.

Temples 
There are many temples of god and goddess. Like Guru Brahmanand Temple, Guru Ravidas Temple, Shiv Temple, Hanuman Temple, Dudha Dhari, Dada Khera,Bhagwan Valmiki temple

Transportation 
Teontha is located on State Highway SH 8 right in the center of Kaithal and Karnal. This Village has bypass road for the heavy vehicles - truck, trailer , and all other than public vehicles. Nearby villages like Sangroli, Chuharmajra, Dusain, Dulyani, Kaul, Sanch, Munnarehri, Habri, Barsana, Jamba are all linked with a road to Teontha village.

The village has 15 min bus service, sometime 5 min, you can directly ride the buses to various destinations - Karnal, Kaithal, Kurukshetra, Delhi, Gurgaon, Faridabad, Tohana, Sonipat, Charkhi dadri, Narnaul, Jhunjhunu - Rajasthan, Jind, Pehowa, Patiala, Assandh and many others.

Schools 
Schools include GPS School Teontha, GSSS School Teontha, J.P Sr.Sec. School Teontha and Shree Geeta Niketan Sr. Sec School Teontha.

External links 

Kaithal Pundri Karnal Highway

References 

Villages in Kaithal district